The Pampa Award (or Pampa Prashasti) is a literary award in the Indian state of Karnataka. The award was established in 1987 by the government of Karnataka. It is the highest literary honor conferred by the Department of Kannada and Culture, Government of Karnataka State, and recognises works written in the Kannada language (1 of the 22 official languages of India).

The award is named after the first Kannada poet Adikavi Pampa. Prior to 1996, the awards were given for a best single work by a Kannada writer. Since then, the award has been given to writers for their lifetime contribution to the Kannada literature. The Pampa Prashasti is presented by the Chief Minister, during the Kadambotsava, a cultural festival held annually in Pampa's hometown of Banavasi in Uttara Kannada district.

Since its inception in 1987, the award has been given to a total of 31 individuals. Kuvempu was the first recipient of the award who was honored for his work Sri Ramayana Darshanam (1949), a modern rendition of the Indian epic Ramayana. In 2015, Chandrashekhar Patil returned his award as a sign of protest against the assassination of the scholar M. M. Kalburgi. The most recent recipient is Siddalingaiah, who was awarded in 2019 for his lifetime contribution.Karnataka Governament announced to In 2020 C.P Krishna Kumar, In 2021 Babu Krishnamurthy and in  2022 Dr S R Ramaswamy

Recipients

References

Further reading

External links
 Pampa Award recipients (in Kannada). Karnataka Sahitya Academy

Civil awards and decorations of Karnataka
Indian literary awards